The 6 Hours of Donington is a sports car race held at Donington Park in the United Kingdom.  The event has been held sporadically since 1989.

Results

External links
Racing Sports Cars: Donington archive
Ultimate Racing History: Donington archive